The final tournament of the 1960 European Nations' Cup was a single-elimination tournament involving the four teams that qualified from the quarter-finals. There were two rounds of matches: a semi-final stage leading to the final to decide the champions. The final tournament began with the semi-finals on 6 July and ended with the final on 10 July at the Parc des Princes in Paris. The Soviet Union won the tournament with a 2–1 victory over Yugoslavia.

All times Central European Time (UTC+1)

Format
Any game in the final tournament that was undecided by the end of the regular 90 minutes was followed by thirty minutes of extra time (two 15-minute halves). If scores were still level, a coin toss would be used in all matches but the final. If the final finished level after extra time, a replay would take place at a later date to decide the winner.

Teams

Bracket

Semi-finals

France vs Yugoslavia

Czechoslovakia vs Soviet Union

Third place play-off

Final

References

External links
1960 European Nations' Cup at UEFA.com

Knockout stage
Knockout stage
Knockout stage
Knockout stage
Knockout stage
1960 in Paris
Sport in Marseille
International association football competitions hosted by Paris